"Balance-toi" is a 2007 song recorded by NBA player Tony Parker. Written and composed by Skalp, Eloquence and Tony Parker, it was the singer's debut single from his eponymous album. It was released on 26 March 2007 and achieved success in France.

Background
The song is produced by Skalp, a member of the French producer duo Kore & Skalp. Tony Parker was the first artist to sign with the newly established record label Music One, a record label from French TV station TF1.

In the music video, Parker's former wife Eva Longoria can be seen.

Chart performances
The song had heavy airplay rotation on French radio stations such as NRJ and Skyrock.

In France, the single went straight to number one on 5 May 2007, selling over 10,000 units, and remained at its peak for one week. The following weeks, it fell gradually on the charts and totaled four weeks in the top ten, eleven weeks in top 50 and twenty one weeks on the chart.

Track listings
 CD single
 "Balance-toi" (radio edit) — 3:36
 "Balance-toi" (remix club extended by Skalp) — 4:38 
 "Balance-toi" (radio edit/instrumental) — 3:32

 CD single - Promo
 "Balance-toi" (radio edit) — 3:36

 Digital download
 "Balance-toi" (radio edit) — 3:36
 "Balance-toi" (remix club extended by Skalp) — 4:38
 "Balance-toi" (radio edit/instrumental) — 3:32

Charts

Peak positions

End of year charts

References

External links

"Balance-toi" music video
Teleestmatele.com 

2007 debut singles
SNEP Top Singles number-one singles
Tony Parker songs
2007 songs
Songs written by Skalp